Valley of the Wolves: Gladio is a 2009 Turkish action film directed by Sadullah Şentürk. It follows the retired security intelligence agent İskender Büyük, as he decides to strike back against his one-time employers by revealing all he knows about Gladio. It is part of the Valley of the Wolves media franchise, based on the Turkish television series of the same name, along with Valley of the Wolves: Iraq (2006) and Valley of the Wolves: Palestine (2010).

Synopsis 
Retired security intelligence agent Iskender Buyuk (Alexander the Great) has kept his government's secrets for years, but when the men he has sworn to protect suddenly deserts him, Isekender finds himself in the defendant's chair, with only young and inexperienced lawyer Ayse to represent his interests. Angered by this turn of events, Iskender decides to strike back against his one-time employers by revealing all he knows about covert op missions.

Cast 
Musa Uzunlar – İskender Büyük
Tuğrul Çetiner – Bülent Fuat Aras
Ayfer Dönmez – Ayse
Ali Başar – Shahid Major Ahmet Cem Ersever
Sezai Aydın – Turgut Özal 
Işıl Ertuna – Semra Özal
Hakan İlçin – Gendarmerie Commander
Köksal Engür – Process notes General
Ali Rıza Soydan – Şener Pasha 
Sinan Pekinton – Judge
Uğur Taşdemir – Announcer
Hakan Vanlı – Journalist Ali
Celalettin Demirel – Head guards
Yurdaer Tosun – Ercüment
Buket Aslan – İskender's Girlfriend 
Hüseyin Yirik – İskender's lawyer 
Erol Alpsoykan – Av. Haşim İçtürk 
Sinan Altuntaş – Security
Mustafa Develi – Abdullah Öcalan 
Serap Ergen – Kurdish Women
Rafet Özdemir – Prime Minister 
Cengiz Gürkısmet – Maestro 
Sinem Öçalır – Clerk 
Yıldıray Yıldızoğlu – Usher
Ülkü Şahiner – Pasha's wife notes client

Release

Reception

Box office
The film was the fifth highest grossing Turkish film of 2009 with a total worldwide gross of $4,703,086.

Reviews
Turkish Daily News reviewer Emrah Güler, states that the film "comes to theaters in the heat of the Ergenekon investigation, an alleged ultra-nationalistic organization with ties in the military, media and justice, and accused of terrorism, a media-favorite for the last six months," and "real questions on the organization PKK, coups in the last half-a-century, and alleged assassinations against previous presidents are answered through a fictitious deep throat". He recommends the film to "those who couldn’t get more of the original series, and those who feed on state conspiracies", but says that "the movie features a plethora of plot holes, inconsistencies within the script, with real time events, and with its predecessors. Those who are hoping for impressive action scenes like in Kurtlar Vadisi – Irak go home empty-handed as well". He finishes by saying: "those who refrain from subjective political dramas, and those who’re tired of hearing and reading about the never ending Ergenekon stories" should avoid it.

According to Betül Akkaya Demirbaş in Today's Zaman: "It addresses Turkey’s years-long adventure with the deep state and illegal formations nested within the state and aims to provide an opportunity for movie fans to closely look at the “deep gangs” that attempted to stir and divide Turkey with subversive plots".

References

External links
 
 
 

Films set in Turkey
Operation Gladio
Turkish action films
Turkish sequel films
Valley of the Wolves
2000s action drama films
2000s Turkish-language films
2009 action films
2009 drama films
2009 films